Countess of Anglesey is a title normally given to the wife of the Earl of Anglesey. Women who have held the title include:

Elizabeth Annesley, Countess of Anglesey (1620–1698)
Elizabeth Annesley, Countess of Anglesey (died 1700)
Lady Catherine Darnley (c.1681–1743), later Catherine Sheffield, Duchess of Buckingham and Normanby
Henrietta Stanley, 4th Baroness Strange (1687–1714)
Juliana Annesley, Countess of Anglesey (died 1777)